Just a Game may refer to:

 Just a Game (album), a 1979 album by Triumph
 "Just a Game", a song by Birdy
 "Just a Game", a song by The Monkees, from their album, Instant Replay
 Just a Game (horse), a Thoroughbred racehorse
 Just a Game (film), a 1983 Canadian drama film

See also
 Just a Game Stakes, an American Thoroughbred horse race